Events from the year 1934 in the United States.

Incumbents

Federal Government 
 President: Franklin D. Roosevelt (D-New York)
 Vice President: John Nance Garner (D-Texas)
 Chief Justice: Charles Evans Hughes (New York)
 Speaker of the House of Representatives: Henry Thomas Rainey (D-Illinois) (until August 19)
 Senate Majority Leader: Joseph Taylor Robinson (D-Arkansas)
 Congress: 73rd

Events

January
 January 26 – The Apollo Theater opens in Harlem, New York City.
 January 27 – Albert Einstein visits the White House.
 January 30 – Gold Reserve Act: All gold held in the Federal Reserve to be surrendered to the Department of the Treasury; immediately following, President Roosevelt raises the statutory gold price from $20.67 per ounce to $35.

February
 February 22 – Frank Capra's It Happened One Night, starring Clark Gable and Claudette Colbert, is released. It becomes a smash hit and the first of Capra's great screen classics. It becomes the first film to win all 5 of the major Academy Awards – Best Actor, Best Actress, Best Screenplay, Best Director, and Best Picture. Gable and Colbert receive their only Oscars for this film.

March
 March 3 – John Dillinger escapes from jail in Crown Point, Indiana, using a wooden pistol.
 March 12 – The 6.5  Hansel Valley earthquake affects a sparsely populated area of northern Utah with a maximum Mercalli intensity of VIII (Severe), causing light damage and two deaths.
 March 13 – John Dillinger and his gang rob the First National Bank in Mason City, Iowa.
 March 16 – The 6th Academy Awards, hosted by Will Rogers, are presented at Ambassador Hotel in Los Angeles, with Frank Lloyd's Cavalcade winning the Academy Award for Best Picture. It also receives the most awards with three, including Best Director for Lloyd, and is among three films (the others being Frank Borzage's A Farewell to Arms and Frank Capra's Lady for a Day) to each receive the most nominations with four. It is the final awards season until 2021 to accommodate two calendar years.
 March 24 – The Tydings–McDuffie Act comes into effect, establishing the Philippine Commonwealth which allows greater self-government of the Philippines, and scheduling full independence from the U.S. for 1944. Sugar imports are reduced and immigration is limited to 50 Filipino people per year.

April
 April 1 – Clyde Barrow and Bonnie Parker kill 2 young highway patrolmen near Grapevine, Texas.
 April 12 
U.S. publication of the novel Tender Is the Night by F. Scott Fitzgerald
 April 22 – John Dillinger and two others shoot their way out of an FBI ambush in northern Wisconsin.

May

 May 5 – The first Three Stooges short, Woman Haters, is released. 
 May 9 – 1934 West Coast waterfront strike: A general strike is engaged in San Francisco.
 May 11 – Dust Bowl: A strong 2-day dust storm removes massive amounts of Great Plains topsoil in one of the worst dust storms of the Dust Bowl.
 May 15
 The United States Department of Justice offers a $25,000 reward for John Dillinger.
 Nantucket Lightship LV-117 sinks after colliding with RMS Olympic.
 May 16 – Teamsters in Minneapolis begin a strike that lasts until a settlement proposal is accepted on August 21.
 May 23
 A team of police officers, led by Texas Ranger Frank Hamer, ambush bank robbers Bonnie Parker and Clyde Barrow near their hide-out in Black Lake, Louisiana, killing them both.
 The "Battle of Toledo" begins during the Auto-Lite strike in Toledo, Ohio, continuing until May 27.
 May 30 – Everglades National Park is established.

June
 June 4 – USS Ranger is commissioned.
 June 6 – New Deal: U.S. President Franklin D. Roosevelt signs the Securities Exchange Act into law, establishing the U.S. Securities and Exchange Commission.
June 15 – Great Smoky Mountains National Park is established.
 June 18 –  expands the crime of making false statements to remove the requirement of an intent to defraud and expands the coverage to "any matter within the jurisdiction" of the federal government.

July
 July 1 
The world-famous Brookfield Zoo opens in Brookfield, Illinois.
The Hays Office censorship code for motion pictures goes into full effect.
 July 5 – 1934 West Coast waterfront strike: Police in San Francisco open fire on a crowd of striking longshoremen, killing two.
 July 15 – The American film industry begins to rigorously enforce the Motion Picture Production Code. 
 July 17 – The North Dakota Supreme Court declares Lieutenant Governor Ole H. Olson the legitimate governor and tells William Langer to resign. Langer proceeds to declare North Dakota independent. He revokes the declaration after the Supreme Court justices meet him.
 July 22 – Outside Chicago's Biograph Theatre, "Public Enemy No. 1" John Dillinger is mortally wounded by FBI agents.

August
 August 15 – The United States occupation of Haiti ends as the last Marines depart.
 August 19 – The first All-American Soap Box Derby is held in Dayton, Ohio.
 August 25 – Anti-union vigilantes seize the town of McGuffey, Ohio, during the Hardin County onion pickers strike.

September
 September 8 – Off the New Jersey coast, a fire aboard the passenger liner Morro Castle kills 134 people.
 September 29–October – Folk song collector John Lomax makes the first recordings of "Rock Island Line" at prison farms in Arkansas.

October
 October 9 – The St. Louis Cardinals defeat the Detroit Tigers, 4 games to 3, to win their third World Series title.
 October 17 – Harry Pierpont is executed in the electric chair in Columbus, Ohio, for killing Sheriff Jess Sarber while breaking John Dillinger out of jail in Lima, Ohio.
 October 22 – "Pretty Boy" Floyd is shot and killed by FBI agents near East Liverpool, Ohio.

November
 November 5 – Kelayres massacre: An election-eve rally by Democrats in the coal-mining village of Kelayres, Pennsylvania, is fired on as it passes the home of a leading local Republican family, resulting in 5 deaths.
 November 20–21 – Business Plot: An alleged coup to overthrow President Franklin D. Roosevelt is investigated by the McCormack–Dickstein Committee and is reported by the Philadelphia Record.
 November 21 – Cole Porter's musical Anything Goes, starring Ethel Merman, premieres in New York City.
 November 26 – Universal Pictures releases the first film version of Fannie Hurst's novel, Imitation of Life, starring Claudette Colbert and Louise Beavers. It gives Beavers, usually featured in small roles as a maid, her best screen role, and features the largest supporting role played by a black person in a Hollywood film up until then. Its storyline is extremely daring for a 1934 film – part of it revolves around a young mulatto girl rejecting her mother and trying to "pass for white". It is the first Hollywood film to seriously deal with this subject. The 1936 film version of Show Boat, also from Universal, will deal with a similar storyline.
 November 27 – A running gun battle between FBI agents and bank robber Baby Face Nelson results in the death of one FBI agent and the mortal wounding of special agent Samuel P. Cowley, who was still able to mortally wound Nelson.

December
 December 26 – An American Airlines aircraft crashes in the Adirondack Mountains.
 December 29 – Japan renounces the Washington Naval Treaty of 1922 and the London Naval Treaty of 1930.

Undated
 Goodwill Easter Seals Miami Valley is founded in Miami Valley, Ohio.
 National Archives established.
 National Union for Social Justice (organization) founded.

Ongoing
 Lochner era (c. 1897–c. 1937)
 U.S. occupation of Haiti (1915–1934)
 Dust Bowl (1930–1936)
 New Deal (1933–1939)

Sport 
April 10 - Chicago Black Hawks win their First Stanley Cup by defeating the Detroit Red Wings 3 games to 1. The deciding game was played at Chicago Stadium

Births

January

 January 1 
 George D. Behrakis, Greek-American philanthropist
 Alan Berg, Jewish talk show host (d. 1984)
 January 7
 Jack D. Forbes, Native American writer, scholar, and political activist (d. 2011)
 Charles Jenkins Sr., American sprinter
 Joseph Naso, American serial killer
 January 9 – Bart Starr, American football player and coach (d. 2019)
 January 10 – Leonard Boswell, American politician (d. 2018)
 January 16 – Marilyn Horne, American mezzo-soprano
 January 17 – Cedar Walton, American jazz pianist (d. 2013)
 January 19 – Phil Rollins, American basketball player
 January 20 – Dave Hull, American former radio personality
 January 21 – Ann Wedgeworth, American actress (d. 2017)
 January 22 – Bill Bixby, actor and television director (d. 1993)
 January 23
 Lou Antonio, actor, director
 Carmine Caridi, actor (d. 2019)
 January 24 
 Stanley Falkow, microbiologist (d. 2018)
 Leonard Goldberg, film and television producer (d. 2019)
 January 26 
 Huey "Piano" Smith, American rhythm and blues pianist (d. 2023)
 Bob Uecker, American baseball player, sportscaster, comedian and actor 
 January 30 – Tammy Grimes, American actress (d. 2016)
 January 31 –  Stephen H. Sachs, American lawyer and politician  (d. 2022)

February

 February 1 – Bob Shane, American folk singer and guitarist (The Kingston Trio) (d. 2020)
 February 5 – Hank Aaron, African-American baseball player (d. 2021)
 February 7
 Frank Clarke, American football player, sportscaster (d. 2018)
 Earl King, American musician (d. 2003)
 February 9 
 Bill Fulcher, American football player and coach (d. 2022)
 John Ziegler Jr., American lawyer, ice hockey executive (d. 2018)
 February 11
 Tina Louise, American actress (Gilligan's Island)
 Mel Carnahan, American politician (d. 2000) 
 February 12
 Anne Osborn Krueger, American economist
 Bill Russell, African-American basketball player and coach (d. 2022)
 February 13 – George Segal, American actor (d. 2021)
 February 14 – Florence Henderson, American actress, singer and television personality (d. 2016)
 February 15 – William Newsom, American judge (d. 2018) 
 February 16
 Harold "Hal" Kalin, American singer (The Kalin Twins) (d. 2005)
 Herbert "Herbie" Kalin, American singer (The Kalin Twins) (d. 2006)
 February 18 – Ronald F. Marryott, American admiral (d. 2005)
 February 19 – Michael Tree, American violist (d. 2018)
 February 20 – Bobby Unser, American race car driver (d. 2021)
 February 21 – Rue McClanahan, American actress (d. 2010)
 February 22
 Sparky Anderson, American baseball manager (d. 2010)
 Van Williams, American actor (d. 2016)
 February 26 – Joe Holup, American basketball player (d. 1998)
 February 27 
 Ralph Nader, American consumer activist, presidential candidate
 Van Williams, American actor (d. 2016)

March

 March 1 – Joan Hackett, American actress (d. 1983)
 March 4
 John Duffey, American bluegrass musician (d. 1996)
 Anne Haney, American actress (d. 2001)
 Barbara McNair, African-American singer, actress (d. 2007)
 March 5 – Bob Skoronski, American football player (d. 2018)
 March 6
 Milton Diamond, American sexologist and professor of anatomy and reproductive biology
 Red Simpson, American country music singer-songwriter (d. 2016)
 March 7
 Gray Morrow, American comic book artist, book illustrator (d. 2001)
 Willard Scott, American television weather reporter (The Today Show) (d. 2021)
 March 9
 Del Close, American actor, improviser, writer and teacher (d. 1999)
 Joyce Van Patten, American actress
 March 11 – Sam Donaldson, American reporter
 March 13 – Barry Hughart, American author and screenwriter (d. 2019)
 March 14
Eugene Cernan, American astronaut (d. 2017)
Paul Rader, American General of The Salvation Army
 March 17 – Frederick T. Mackenzie, American sedimentary, global biogeochemist
 March 18 – Charley Pride, African-American baseball player and country musician (d. 2020)
 March 20 – Willie Brown, African-American Mayor of San Francisco
 March 21 – Al Freeman Jr., African-American actor (d. 2012)
 March 22 – Orrin Hatch, American politician (d. 2022)
 March 25
 Johnny Burnette, American rockabilly singer, songwriter and musician (d. 1964)
 Gloria Steinem, American feminist
 March 26 
 Alan Arkin, American actor, director, and screenwriter 
 Gino Cappelletti, American football player (d. 2022)
 March 27 – Arthur Mitchell, African-American ballet dancer and choreographer (d. 2018)
 March 28 – Lester R. Brown, American environmentalist 
 March 31
 Richard Chamberlain, American actor
 Shirley Jones, American singer, actress and first wife of Jack Cassidy
 John D. Loudermilk, American singer-songwriter (d. 2016)
 Orion Samuelson, American television personality

April

 April 1
 Jim Ed Brown, American singer-songwriter and guitarist (d. 2015)
 Don Hastings, American actor
 Rod Kanehl, American baseball player and manager (d. 2004)
 April 2
 Paul Avery, American journalist (d. 2000)
 Paul Cohen, American mathematician (d. 2007)
 Carl Kasell, American radio personality (d. 2018)
 April 7 
 David T. Kennedy, American attorney, politician (d. 2014)
 Jerold Ottley, American music director and conductor (d. 2021)
 April 13 – Nancy Kissinger, American philanthropist
 April 18
James Drury, American actor (d. 2020)
Pedro Tenorio, Northern Mariana Islander politician (d. 2018) 
 April 20 – Robert G. Wilmers, American billionaire banker (d. 2017)
 April 24 – Shirley MacLaine (Beaty), American actress and activist
 April 25
 Johnny McCarthy, American basketball player
 Denny Miller, American actor (Wagon Train) (d. 2014)
 April 29 
 Norman Edge, American jazz musician (d. 2018)
 Otis Rush, African-American blues guitarist and singer-songwriter (d. 2018)

May

 May 3 – Frankie Valli, American musician (The Four Seasons)
 May 5
 Ace Cannon, American saxophonist (d. 2018)
 Johnnie Taylor, American singer-songwriter (d. 2000)
 May 6 – Richard Shelby, American politician
 May 9 – Nathan Dean, American soldier and politician (d. 2013)
 May 10 – Gary Owens, American disc jockey, voice actor and announcer (Rowan and Martin's Laugh-In) (d. 2015)
 May 11
 Jim Jeffords, American politician (d. 2014)
 Jack Twyman, American basketball player (d. 2012)
 May 12 – John Amirante, American singer (d. 2018)
 May 13 – Leon Wagner, baseball player (d. 2004)
 May 18 – Dwayne Hickman, actor 
 May 19 – Jim Lehrer, television journalist (d. 2020)
 May 22 – Peter Nero, pianist
 May 23 – Robert Moog, inventor of the synthesizer (d. 2005)
 May 24 
 Charlie Dick, record promoter (d. 2015)
 William R. Ratchford, politician (d. 2011)
 May 27 
 Harlan Ellison, writer (d. 2018)
 Franklin A. Thomas, businessman and philanthropist (d. 2021)
 May 28 
 Chuck Missler, author (d. 2018)
 Betty X, African-American educator, civil rights advocate (d. 1997) ***
 May 29 – Grandma Lee, stand-up comedian (d. 2020)

June

 June 1
 Pat Boone, American actor, pop singer
 Peter Masterson, American actor, director, producer and writer (d. 2018)
 Ken McElroy, American criminal (d. 1981)
 June 3
 Jim Gentile, American baseball player and manager
 Rolland D. McCune, American minister and theologian (d. 2019)
 June 5 – Bill Moyers, American journalist
 June 6 – Roy Innis, American activist and politician (d. 2017)
 June 7 
 Billy Al Bengston, American visual artist and sculptor (d. 2022)
 Wynn Stewart, American country music singer-songwriter and guitarist (d. 1985) 
 June 9 – Jackie Wilson, African-American singer (d. 1984)
 June 13 – Marianne Means, American political journalist (d. 2017)
 June 16
 Bill Cobbs, African-American actor
 William F. Sharpe, American economist, Nobel Prize laureate
 June 19 – Herbert Kleber, American psychiatrist (d. 2018)
 June 22
 Ray Mantilla, American jazz percussionist (d. 2020)
 Russ Snyder, American Major League Baseball player
 Nancy R. Stocksdale, American politician
 June 23
 Marino Casem, American football coach, athletic administrator (d. 2020)
 Jesse White, athlete, educator and politician
 June 25 – Jack Hayford, evangelist, author, and minister
 June 26
 Dave Grusin, composer, arranger, producer, and pianist
 John V. Tunney, politician (d. 2018)
 June 27 – Ed Hobaugh, baseball player
 June 28
 Carl Levin, politician
 Michael Artin, mathematician
 Bette Greene, author (d. 2020)
 June 29 
 Bob Burrow, basketball player (d. 2019)
 Susan George, American and French political, social scientist, activist and writer
 Chuck Schaden, television presenter
 Duane Wilson, baseball player
 June 30 
Harry Blackstone Jr., magician (d. 1997)
 Aron Tager, actor, poet, artist and sculptor (d. 2019)

July

 July 1
 Jamie Farr, American actor (M*A*S*H)
 Sydney Pollack, American film director, and actor (d. 2008)
 July 6 – LaFarr Stuart, American computer music pioneer, computer engineer
 July 8 
 Rodney Stark, American sociologist
 Edward D. DiPrete, American politician
 July 9 – Michael Graves, American architect (d. 2015)
 July 10 
 Jerry Nelson, American puppeteer with The Muppets (Sesame Street, Fraggle Rock) (d. 2012)
 Barry Sussman, American editor and author (d. 2022)
 July 11 
 Jim Ridlon, American football safety 
 Woody Sauldsberry, American basketball player (d. 2007)
 Dick Treleaven, American politician
 July 12 – Van Cliburn, American pianist (d. 2013)
 July 13 – Phillip Crosby, American actor, singer (d. 2004)
 July 14 – Lee Elder, American professional golfer
 July 16 
 Bill Gunter, American politician 
 Katherine D. Ortega, 38th Treasurer of the United States 
 George Perles, American football player and coach (d. 2020)
 July 18 – Joan Evans, actress
 July 19 – Bobby Bradford, jazz trumpeter, cornetist, bandleader, and composer 
 July 21 – Edolphus Towns, politician
 July 22 – Louise Fletcher, actress (One Flew Over the Cuckoo's Nest)  (d. 2022)
 July 27 – Ajahn Sumedho, Theravada Buddhist representative in the West
 July 28 
 Jacques d'Amboise, ballet dancer (d. 2021)
 Bud Luckey, voice actor, Pixar animator (d. 2018)
 July 30 – Bud Selig, Major League Baseball commissioner

August

 August 3 – Haystacks Calhoun, professional wrestler (d. 1989)
 August 4 – Dallas Green,  baseball player, manager, executive (d. 2017)
 August 5
 Wendell Berry, novelist, essayist, and poet
 Vern Gosdin, country music singer (d. 2009)
 Cammie King, child actor (d. 2010)
 August 10 – James Tenney, experimental composer (d. 2006)
 August 16
 Donnie Dunagan, child actor and U.S. Marine Corps major
 Ketty Lester, singer and actress
 August 18 
 Vincent Bugliosi, prosecutor, author (d. 2015)
 Rafer Johnson, decathlete and actor (d. 2020)
 August 19
 David Durenberger, politician (d. 2023)
 Renée Richards, transsexual physician, tennis player
 August 22 – Norman Schwarzkopf, U.S. Army general (d. 2012)
 August 26 – Tom Heinsohn, basketball player, coach, and broadcaster (d. 2020)
 August 27 – Dave Piontek, basketball player (d. 2004)
 August 29 – David Pryor, politician

September

 September 2
 Chuck McCann, American actor (d. 2018)
 Grady Nutt, humorist (d. 1982)
 September 4 – Ronald Ludington, figure skating coach and pair skater (d. 2020)
 September 7 – Little Milton, American musician (d. 2005)
 September 10 
 Charles Kuralt, American journalist (CBS Sunday Morning)  (d. 1997)
 September 10 – Mr. Wrestling II, American professional wrestler (d. 2020)
 September 12 – Albie Pearson, American baseball player d. 2023)
 September 14 – Kate Millett, American sculptor and feminist activist (d. 2017)
 September 15 - Tomie dePaola, children's author and illustrator (d. 2020)
 September 16 – Elgin Baylor, American basketball player, executive  (d. 2021)
 September 17 – Maureen Connolly, American tennis player (d. 1969)
 September 19 – Lloyd Haynes, American actor and television writer (d. 1987)
 September 20
 Tony Alamo, American religious cult leader, convicted criminal
 Don Luce, American aid worker and anti-war activist (d. 2022)
 Jeff Morris, American actor (d. 2004)
 September 21 – Ron Sobieszczyk, American basketball player (d. 2009)
 September 22 – Lute Olson, American basketball coach
 September 26 –  Suzi Gablik, American artist and art critic (d. 2022)
 September 27
 Beverly Armstrong, American female professional baseball player
 Wilford Brimley, American actor and singer (d. 2020)

October

 October 1 – Chuck Hiller, American baseball player (d. 2004)
 October 2 – Earl Wilson, African-American baseball player (d. 2005)
 October 4 
 Sam Huff, American football player (d. 2021)
 Gwen Margolis, politician (d. 2020)
 October 6 – Marshall Rosenberg, American psychologist, writer (d. 2015)
 October 7 
 Amiri Baraka, African-American poet, playwright and activist (d. 2014)
 Willie Naulls, American basketball player (d. 2018)
 October 15 – John Coleman, American meteorologist (d. 2018)
 October 16 – Robert M. O'Neil, American educator (d. 2018)
 October 18 – Chuck Swindoll, American evangelist
 October 20
 Michael Dunn, a.k.a. Gary Neil Miller, dwarf American actor and singer (d. 1973)
 Eddie Harris, African-American jazz musician (d. 1996)
 Charles Liebman, American-born Israeli political scientist and author on Jewish life and Israel (d. 2003 in Israel)
 October 26 – Hot Rod Hundley, American basketball player (d. 2015)

November

 November 3 – Bob Hopkins, American basketball player (d. 2015)
 November 6 – Barton Myers, American/Canadian architect
 November 9 – Carl Sagan, American cosmologist (d. 1996)
 November 10 – Joanna Moore, American actress (d. 1997)
 November 12 – Charles Manson, American cult leader and criminal (d. 2017)
 November 13 – Garry Marshall, American film producer, director and actor (d. 2016)
 November 17 – Jim Inhofe, American politician
 November 21 – Laurence Luckinbill, American actor
 November 23 – Michael Wayne, American film producer and actor (d. 2003)
 November 27
 Curtis S. Person Jr., American politician (d. 2020)
 Gilbert Strang, American mathematician
 November 28 – Margaret Farrow, American politician (d. 2022)
 November 29 – Willie Morris, American writer (d. 1999)
 November 30 – Steve Hamilton, American basketball and baseball player (d. 1997)

December

 December 1 – Billy Paul, African-American singer (d. 2016)
 December 2 – Andre Rodgers, American baseball player (d. 2004)
 December 4 – Victor French, American actor, director (d. 1989)
 December 5 – Joan Didion, American novelist (d. 2021)
 December 6 – Nick Bockwinkel, American professional wrestler (d. 2015)
 December 7 – Joey Powers, singer-songwriter (d. 2017)
 December 9
 Henry McNamara, politician (d. 2018)
 Junior Wells, harmonica player (d. 1998)
 December 10 – Howard Martin Temin, geneticist (d. 1994)
 December 13 – Richard D. Zanuck, producer (d. 2012)
 December 16 – Pete Schrum, actor (d. 2003)
 December 19 – Al Kaline, baseball player (d. 2020)
 December 22 – David Pearson, American race car driver (d. 2018)
 December 23 – Dan Swartz, basketball player (d. 1997)
 December 25 – Bob Martinez, politician, 40th Governor of Florida
 December 26 – Mari Hulman George, motorsport executive (d. 2018)
 December 29 – Ed Flanders, actor (d. 1995)
 December 30
 John Norris Bahcall, astrophysicist (d. 2005)
 Joseph P. Hoar, U.S. Marine commander
 Willie Hobbs Moore, African-American engineer (d. 1994)
 Del Shannon, American singer (d. 1990)
 Russ Tamblyn, American dancer, singer and actor

Deaths 
 February 25
 Elizabeth Gertrude Britton, botanist (born 1858)
 John McGraw, baseball manager (born 1873)
 March 21 – Lilyan Tashman, vaudeville, Broadway and film actress (born 1896)
 April 27 – Joe Vila, sportswriter (born 1866)
 May 17 – Cass Gilbert, architect (born 1859)
 May 23
 Clyde Barrow, outlaw (shot) (born 1909)
 Bonnie Parker, outlaw (shot) (born 1910)
 May 24 – Brand Whitlock, journalist and politician (born 1869)
 May 31 – Lew Cody, film actor (born 1884)
 June 8 – Dorothy Dell, film actress (automobile accident) (born 1915)
 June 15 – George W. Fuller, sanitation engineer (born 1868)
 June 20 – Andrew Jackson Zilker, philanthropist (born 1858)
 June 21 – Thorne Smith, humorist and fantasy author (heart attack) (born 1892)
 June 24 – Charles S. Thomas, U.S. Senator from Colorado from 1913 to 1921 (born 1849)
 July 15 – Louis F. Gottschalk, composer (born 1869)
 July 18 – Sy Sanborn, sportswriter (born 1866)
 July 21 – Julian Hawthorne, journalist and novelist (born 1846)
 July 22 – John Dillinger, criminal (shot) (born 1903)
 July 26 – Winsor McCay, comic creator and animator (born 1871)
 August 8 – Wilbert Robinson, baseball manager (born 1863)
 August 10 – George W. Hill, film director (born 1895)
 August 13 – Mary Hunter Austin, travel writer (born 1868)
 August 14 – Raymond Hood, architect (born 1881)

 August 30 – Rebecca Richardson Joslin, writer, lecturer, benefactor, clubwoman (born 1846)

 September 2
 Russ Columbo, singer and actor (shot) (born 1908)
 Alcide Nunez, jazz clarinetist (born 1884)
 October 6 – James Taliaferro, U.S. Senator from Florida from 1899 to 1911 (born 1847)
 October 20 – Josephine White Bates, Canadian-born American author (born 1862)
 October 22 – Pretty Boy Floyd, bank robber (shot) (born 1904)
 November 10 – Ion Farris, politician, Speaker of the Florida House of Representatives (born 1878)
 November 22 – Harry Steppe, vaudeville performer (born 1888)
 November 27 – Baby Face Nelson, gangster (shot) (born 1908)
 December 10 – Theobald Smith, bacteriologist (born 1859)
 December 26 – Wallace Thurman, African American novelist (TB) (born 1902)
 December 28 – Lowell Sherman, film actor and director (born 1885)
 December 29 – Elnora Monroe Babcock, suffragist (born 1852)
 December 31 – Cornelia Clapp, marine biologist (born 1859)

See also
 List of American films of 1934
 Timeline of United States history (1930–1949)

References

External links
 

 
1930s in the United States
United States
United States
Years of the 20th century in the United States